Spreitzer (from German spreizen "to spread (legs)") is a German surname belonging to the group of family names based on a personal characteristic, in this case from a nickname for someone who spread his/her legs when walking. Notable people with the name include:
 Edward Spreitzer (born 1961), American convicted murderer
 Ken Spreitzer (born 1964), American software developer
 Mark Spreitzer (died 1986), American politician
 Mike Spreitzer (born 1981), American rock guitarist

References 

German-language surnames
Surnames from nicknames